Dorothee Vieth (born 12 October 1960) is a German Paralympic cyclist.

Vieth first participated in the Summer Paralympics in 2008 where she won two bronze medals in the time trial and road race events. At the 2012 games she won a silver medal in the time trial event and a bronze in the road race event and won a gold medal in the time trial event at the 2016 games.

She has a paralysis of the leg and gluteus muscles. She is also a violinist and violin teacher.

References

External links
 
 

1960 births
Living people
German female cyclists
German disabled sportspeople
Paralympic cyclists of Germany
Paralympic gold medalists for Germany
Paralympic silver medalists for Germany
Paralympic bronze medalists for Germany
Paralympic medalists in cycling
Cyclists at the 2008 Summer Paralympics
Cyclists at the 2012 Summer Paralympics
Cyclists at the 2016 Summer Paralympics
Medalists at the 2008 Summer Paralympics
Medalists at the 2012 Summer Paralympics
Medalists at the 2016 Summer Paralympics
20th-century German women
21st-century German women
Cyclists from Hamburg